Manp'o Ch'ŏngnyŏn station is a railway station in Manp'o municipal city, Chagang Province, North Korea, on the Manp'o Line of the Korean State Railway; it is also the starting point of the Pukbunaeryuk Line to Hyesan and of the Unha Line to Unha.

History

The station, originally called Manp'o station, was opened on 1 February 1939 by the Chosen Government Railway, along with the rest of the final section of the Manp'o Line from Kanggye to Manp'o. It received its current name after the establishment of the DPRK. With the opening of the Ji'an Yalu River Border Railway Bridge later in 1939 a connection was made with the South Manchuria Railway, and in October 1939 a P'yŏngyang-Jilin passenger train was put into service.

Services

There is an express passenger service operating between Manp'o Ch'ŏngnyŏn and Haeju, two semi-express trains, between Manp'o and Hamhŭng and between Manp'o and Changyŏn, along with various commuter trains.

An international passenger service from Manp'o to Ji'an exists in the form of a single passenger car attached to the daily cross-border freight train. This train is not open to use by foreigners other than ethnic Koreans from China.

References

Railway stations in North Korea